The 2007–08 Eredivisie Vrouwen was the first season of the Netherlands women's professional football league. It took place from 29 August 2007 until 21 May 2008 with six teams participating. AZ became the first Eredivisie winners. The 60 matches of the season had a 45,695 total attendance.

Teams

On 20 March 2007, the league was officially unveiled by the KNVB with the six clubs taking part.

Source: Soccerway

Format
The season was played in a quadruple round-robin format, where all six participating teams played each other four times (twice away and twice at home), a total of 20 matches each. The champion qualified to the UEFA Women's Cup. There was no relegation system in place.

Standings

Results

Season's first half

Season's second half

Top scorers

Source: vrouwenvoetbalnederland.nl

References

External links
Official website
Season on soccerway.com

Ned
1
2007-08